Grenada competed at the 2016 Summer Olympics in Rio de Janeiro, Brazil, from 5 to 21 August 2016. This was the nation's ninth consecutive appearance at the Summer Olympics.

Grenada Olympic Committee sent a total of seven athletes, five men and two women, to the Games, competing only in athletics and swimming. The Grenadian team featured two returning athletes from London 2012; decathlete Kurt Felix and track sprinter Kirani James, who became the nation's first ever Olympic champion, earning the gold in the men's 400 metres. As the most successful athlete of the Games, James was selected to carry the Grenadian flag for the second consecutive time in the opening ceremony.

Grenada left Rio de Janeiro with an Olympic silver medal won by James in the men's 400 metres, unable to defend his title from the previous Games.

Medalists

Athletics (track and field)
 
Grenadian athletes have so far achieved qualifying standards in the following athletics events (up to a maximum of 3 athletes in each event):

Track & road events

Combined events – Men's decathlon

Swimming

Grenada has received a Universality invitation from FINA to send two swimmers (one male and one female) to the Olympics.

See also
Grenada at the 2015 Pan American Games

References

External links 
 

Nations at the 2016 Summer Olympics
2016
2016 in Grenadian sport